Neferu ("Beauty") was an ancient Egyptian name.

Famous bearers:
 Neferu I, a queen of Montuhotep I (11th dynasty)
 Neferu or Neferukayet, probably the mother of Intef III (11th dynasty)
 Neferu II, a queen of Montuhotep II (11th dynasty)
 Neferu III, a queen of Senusret I (12th dynasty)
 Neferu (13th dynasty) sister to Pharaoh Imyremeshaw or Sehetepkare Intef; mentioned on Papyrus Bulaq 18 with sister-in-law Aya.
 Neferu (13th dynasty), princess, daughter of an unidentified king. Married to Sobekhotep, Chief of Police of the Temple of Anubis, and mentioned on a stela from Abydos.
 Neferu (17th dynasty), mother of Queen Tetisheri.

Fictional characters
Characters in literary and screen works known solely as Neferu include:

 Neferu is the real name for the singer, model and diva named Eliza from Skullgirls

Sources

Ancient Egyptian given names